Sinyakovo is a rural locality (a village) in Tolshmenskoye Rural Settlement, Totemsky District, Vologda Oblast, Russia. The population was 4 as of 2002.

Geography 
Sinyakovo is located 96 km south of Totma (the district's administrative centre) by road. Luchkino is the nearest rural locality.

References 

Rural localities in Tarnogsky District